USS Indra (ARL-37) was one of 39  landing craft repair ships built for the United States Navy during World War II.

Construction
Originally laid down as LST-1147 on 12 February 1945; reclassified while building and launched as ARL-37 by Chicago Bridge & Iron Company, of Seneca, Illinois, 21 May 1945; sponsored by Mrs. Regina K. Hlubek; placed in reduced commission and brought to Bethlehem Key Highway Shipyard, Baltimore, for conversion, and commissioned 2 October 1945.

Service history
After shakedown, Indra sailed to Green Cove Springs, Florida, where she remained from 30 November 1945, until 8 May 1946. She then steamed through the Panama Canal to San Diego, arriving 4 June 1946. The ship remained in California until departing 7 January 1947, for the Far East. Indra arrived at Tsingtao, 19 February 1947, to support the United States Marines there attempting to stabilize the volatile Chinese situation and protect American lives and property. She performed repair and general services there and at Shanghai, until 30 August 1947, when she sailed for San Diego. Upon her arrival on 25 September 1947, Indra was decommissioned on 6 October 1947, and entered the Pacific Reserve Fleet, San Diego Group.

Indra was recommissioned 16 December 1967. During the Vietnam War, Indra participated in the following campaigns:

 Vietnamese Counteroffensive – Phase IV (2 to 16 April 1968)	
 Vietnamese Counteroffensive – Phase V (21 September to 1 November 1968)

Decommissioned in May 1970, she was struck from the Naval Vessel Register in 1984. Transferred to the state of North Carolina in January 1992, she was sunk as an artificial reef off the coast of North Carolina on 4 August 1992.

Awards
Indra earned two battle stars for service during the Vietnam War.

References

Bibliography

External links

 

Achelous-class repair ships
Achelous-class repair ships converted from LST-542-class ships
World War II auxiliary ships of the United States
Cold War auxiliary ships of the United States
Vietnam War auxiliary ships of the United States
Shipwrecks of the Carolina coast
Ships built in Seneca, Illinois
1945 ships
Ships sunk as artificial reefs
Maritime incidents in 1992